Indrapuri Old Mosque (Acehnese: Meuseujid Tuha Indra Puri, Indonesian: Masjid Tua Indrapuri) is a mosque in Indrapuri, Indonesia. Constructed in the early 17th-century, it is one of the oldest mosque in Aceh Province.

History

Indrapuri Old Mosque was constructed between 1607 and 1636. The mosque was built on top of the base of a former 12th-century Hindu temple from the Hindu Kingdom of Lamuri of North Sumatra. It is narrated that the kingdom had fought against navy from China, and Lamuri kings emerged victorious eventually with the help of Meurah Johan who was a prince of Islamic Linga dynasty, and later became a Lamuri king as an adherent of Islam. Since then the place was converted into a mosque.

Renovation occurred in 1696 and later in 1879.

Building

See also

 List of mosques in Indonesia

References

Further reading 

17th-century mosques
Buildings and structures completed in 1636
Mosques in Aceh
Cultural Properties of Indonesia in Aceh
Islam in Aceh